Nutty Fluffies Rollercoaster, also known as simply Nutty Fluffies, is a side-scrolling video game developed by RedLynx and published by Ubisoft for iOS in 2012, and for Android in 2013.

Reception

The iOS version received above-average reviews according to the review aggregation website Metacritic.

References

External links
 

2012 video games
Android (operating system) games
IOS games
Roller coaster games and simulations
Side-scrolling video games
Ubisoft games
Video games about animals
Video games about toys
Video games developed in Finland
Single-player video games